Tracuateua River is a short river in the state of Pará, Brazil. It is protected for most of its length by the  Tracuateua Marine Extractive Reserve created in 2005.

See also
List of rivers of Pará

References

Rivers of Pará
Tributaries of the Amazon River